Shentel Stadium is a 3,000-seat stadium in Winchester, Virginia where it serves as home to the football team of Shenandoah University.

Built in 2001 the stadium's name comes from a sponsorship agreement with Shenandoah Telecommunications Company (or Shentel). It is home to the 2004, 2005 USA South Conference Football Champions. It is also home to the men's and women's soccer teams along with the men's and women's lacrosse teams. The stadium's field is an artificial playing surface.

References

External links
 Information at SU

College football venues
College lacrosse venues in the United States
College soccer venues in the United States
American football venues in Virginia
Lacrosse venues in the United States
Soccer venues in Virginia
2001 establishments in Virginia
Sports venues completed in 2001